Jean-Claude Decagny (10 June 1939 – 6 May 2018) was a French politician who was an MP from 1993 to 2010. He also served as Mayor of Maubeuge from 1984 to 1989 and from 1995 to 2001.

References

1939 births
2018 deaths
20th-century French politicians
21st-century French politicians
Deputies of the 10th National Assembly of the French Fifth Republic
Deputies of the 11th National Assembly of the French Fifth Republic
Deputies of the 12th National Assembly of the French Fifth Republic
Deputies of the 13th National Assembly of the French Fifth Republic
Mayors of places in Hauts-de-France
People from Maubeuge